Pterostylis aquilonia, commonly known as the northern cobra greenhood, is a species of orchid endemic to Queensland. As with similar orchids, the flowering plants differ from those which are not flowering. The non-flowering plants have a rosette of leaves, but the flowering plants lack a rosette and have a single flower with leaves on the flowering spike. This greenhood has a relatively large green, white and reddish-brown self-pollinating flower.

Description
The flowers are white, green, and reddish-brown. The dorsal sepal and petals are fused, forming a hood or "galea" over the column. The dorsal sepal curves forward and ends with a short point. The lateral sepals are held closely against the galea, and there is a broad, flat, platform-like sinus between their bases. Flowering occurs from May to June.

Taxonomy and naming 
Pterostylis aquilonia was first formally described in 1997 by David Jones and Bruce Gray. The description was published in The Orchadian from a specimen collected near Herberton. The specific epithet (aquilonia) is a Latin word meaning "north" or "northern".

Distribution and habitat
The northern cobra greenhood grows in forest on the higher parts of the Atherton Tableland.

References

aquilonia
Endemic orchids of Australia
Orchids of Queensland
Plants described in 1997